This is a list of notable events in country music that took place in 1964.

Events
 January 11 — Billboard increases the length of its Hot Country Singles chart to 50 positions, up from 30 and publishes the first Top Country Albums chart.
 February 1 — Buck Owens' mega-hit, "Love's Gonna Live Here", finishes its 16-week run at No. 1 on the Billboard Hot Country Singles chart. Until 2012, it would be the most recent song to spend 10 or more weeks atop the chart.
 July 31 — A private aircraft piloted by Jim Reeves crashes during a thunderstorm near Nashville, Tennessee. Both Reeves and business partner Dean Manuel are killed in the crash; their bodies are found two days later following a massive search for the two missing men. Reeves, already a huge country star, would leave behind hundreds of unreleased recordings; many of those songs became huge posthumous hits during the next decade. Reeves' death comes just 16 months after the airplane crash deaths of Patsy Cline, Hawkshaw Hawkins and Cowboy Copas, leaving a huge void among country music fans.
 November 28 — "Once a Day," by Connie Smith, begins an eight-week stay at No. 1 on the Billboard Hot Country Singles chart. Until 2012, it is the longest-running No. 1 song by a solo female act, and will make the 23-year-old Smith — a native of Elkhart, Indiana — an overnight sensation.

Top hits of the year

Number-one hits

United States
(as certified by Billboard)

Notes
1^ No. 1 song of the year, as determined by Billboard.
2^ Song dropped from No. 1 and later returned to top spot.
A^ First Billboard No. 1 hit for that artist.
B^ Last Billboard No. 1 hit for that artist.
C^ Only Billboard No. 1 hit for that artist to date.

Canada
(as certified by RPM)

Notes
2^ Song dropped from No. 1 and later returned to top spot.
A^ First RPM No. 1 hit for that artist.
C^ Only RPM No. 1 hit for that artist.

Other major hits

Singles released by American artists

Singles released by Canadian artists

Top new album releases

Births
 January 30 — Patricia Conroy, Canadian country star of the 1990s.
 April 11  — Steve Azar, singer-songwriter known his 2002 single "I Don't Have to Be Me ('til Monday)".
 May 28 — Jimmy Rankin, member of the country pop group The Rankin Family, who began a solo career in the 2000s (decade).
 May 28 — Phil Vassar, singer-songwriter of the late 1990s and 2000s (decade).
 May 30 — Wynonna Judd, daughter half of The Judds, who became a solo star in her own right during the 1990s.
 August 6 — Peggy and Patsy Lynn of The Lynns, twin daughters of Loretta Lynn and recording artists of the 1990s.
 September 19 — Trisha Yearwood, female vocalist active since the early 1990s, known for her close association with Garth Brooks.
 October 31 — Darryl Worley, singer-songwriter since the 2000s (decade), known for patriotic-themed songs ("Have You Forgotten?" and others)

Deaths
 February 28 – Joe Carson, 27, auto accident
 June 9 – Alton Delmore, 55, one half of the old-time harmony duo Delmore Brothers.
 July 31 — Jim Reeves, 40, velvet-voiced singer and leading force in the Nashville Sound; many of his hits came posthumously. (plane crash)

Country Music Hall of Fame Inductees
Tex Ritter (1905–1974)

Major awards

Grammy Awards
Best Country and Western Vocal Performance, Female — "Here Comes My Baby", Dottie West
Best Country and Western Vocal Performance, Male — "Dang Me", Roger Miller
Best Country and Western Single — "Dang Me", Roger Miller
Best Country and Western Song — "Dang Me", Roger Miller (Performer: Roger Miller)
Best Country and Western Album — Dang Me/Chug-a-Lug, Roger Miller
Best New Country and Western Artist — Roger Miller

Further reading
Kingsbury, Paul, "The Grand Ole Opry: History of Country Music. 70 Years of the Songs, the Stars and the Stories," Villard Books, Random House; Opryland USA, 1995
Kingsbury, Paul, "Vinyl Hayride: Country Music Album Covers 1947–1989," Country Music Foundation, 2003
Millard, Bob, "Country Music: 70 Years of America's Favorite Music," HarperCollins, New York, 1993
Whitburn, Joel, "Top Country Songs 1944–2005 – 6th Edition." 2005.

Other links
Country Music Association
Inductees of the Country Music Hall of Fame

External links
Country Music Hall of Fame

Country
Country music by year